The Uppsala–ESO Survey of Asteroids and Comets (UESAC) took place in 1992–1993. A large number of asteroids were investigated. Over 15,000 positions were detected, and orbits were calculated for 2500.

The observations were taken at ESO's La Silla Observatory site in Chile, with a total of 74 obtained photographic plates, and at the Anglo-Australian Observatory (Siding Spring Observatory) in Australia. Details were published in 1996.

List of discovered minor planets 

The Minor Planet Center credits UESAC with the discovery of 1123 numbered minor planets. The discoveries range from the lowest numbered discovery, 6102 Visby, to the currently highest numbered body, . More minor planets may yet to be numbered and added to this list as their orbits are confirmed.

See also 
 List of asteroid-discovering observatories
 
 Uppsala–DLR Asteroid Survey, UDAS
 Uppsala–DLR Trojan Survey, UDTS

References

External links 
 UESAC – The Uppsala-ESO survey of asteroids and comets, Astronomy Astrophysics 318, 631–638 (1997)

Asteroid surveys